The 1966 International cricket season was from May 1966 to August 1966.

Season overview

June

West Indies in England

Denmark in Scotland

September

1966 Rothmans Cup

References

1966 in cricket